Pachyiulus silvestrii is a species of millipede from Julidae family that is endemic to Italy.

References

Julida
Animals described in 1923
Endemic fauna of Italy
Millipedes of Europe